Craig Francis Smith (born December 14, 1972) is an American college basketball coach who is the head coach for the Utah Utes men's team of the Pac-12 Conference. A member of Tim Miles' coaching tree, Smith served as an assistant for Miles at four schools – Mayville State, North Dakota State, Colorado State, and Nebraska. Smith was also the head coach at Mayville State from 2004 to 2007, at South Dakota from 2014 to 2018, and at Utah State from 2018 to 2021.

Early life and education
Born in Stephen, Minnesota, Smith graduated from the University of North Dakota in 1996 with a bachelor's degree in secondary education and Northern State University in South Dakota with a master's degree in education in 1999.

Coaching career

Beginnings as assistant coach (1996–2004)
Smith began his coaching career in 1996 as an assistant coach for one season at Mayville State University, an NAIA school in North Dakota. This was the first of several coaching roles under Tim Miles.

In 1997, Smith enrolled in graduate school at Northern State, an NCAA Division II school in South Dakota, and became a graduate assistant with its men's basketball team. Returning to North Dakota, Smith was an assistant coach at Minot State from 1998 to 2001.

In 2001, Smith reunited with Miles at then-NCAA Division II North Dakota State, where he was an assistant coach and director of operations for three seasons.

Mayville State (2004–2007)
After three seasons at North Dakota State, Smith returned to Mayville State, this time as head coach in 2004. Inheriting a team that had one win in the previous season, Smith led the Comets to 17 wins and a berth in the NAIA Division II Tournament in his first season of 2004–05.

Smith's second season as Mayville State head coach in 2005–06 had a 28–6 record, good enough to break the record for most wins in program history. Mayville won the Dakota Athletic Conference (DAC) regular season and conference titles and qualified for the NAIA Tournament for the second straight season, this time making the quarterfinals. With a 27–9 record in Smith's final season 2006–07, Mayville State won both DAC titles again and made the championship round of the NAIA tournament as a no. 13 seed. Smith won NAIA Division II Coach of the Year honors in 2007 and DAC Coach of the Year Honors in 2006 and 2007.

Assistant coach at Colorado State and Nebraska (2007–2014)
Smith got his first NCAA Division I job on April 10, 2007 as director of operations at Colorado State, his third association with Tim Miles. Miles promoted Smith to a full assistant coach in 2008. During his time at Colorado State, Smith helped the team qualify for the 2010 CBI, 2011 NIT, and 2012 NCAA tournament.

On April 25, 2012, Smith followed Miles to Nebraska after Miles took the head coaching job there. Smith helped Nebraska make the 2014 NCAA tournament.

South Dakota (2014–2018)
Smith became a head coach again on March 24, 2014, when South Dakota athletic director David Herbster named Smith men's basketball head coach. Following a 12–18 season in 2013–14, South Dakota went 17–16 (10–8 in Summit League  play) in Smith's first season of 2014–15. In 2016–17, Smith won Summit League Coach of the Year honors after South Dakota won the Summit League regular season title and qualified for the 2017 NIT. Smith's last season in 2017 with the Coyotes ended 26–9, with a 2nd-place finish in the Summit League both in the regular season and conference tournament, the Coyotes would later fall to North Texas in the 2018 College Basketball Invitational first round 77-90.

Utah State (2018–2021)
On March 26, 2018, Smith was announced as Utah State's new head coach after the firing of Tim Duryea. In just his first season at the school, he led the Aggies to a share of the Mountain West regular-season title, as well as the tournament title. This performance earned them their first appearance in the NCAA tournament since 2011. The team repeated as Mountain West tournament champions in 2020, though the NCAA tournament was cancelled amid the ongoing COVID-19 pandemic. In 2021, Smith earned his third consecutive NCAA tournament appearance with the Aggies with an at-large bid.

Utah (2021–present)
Smith was hired to be the new head coach of the Utah Utes men's basketball team on March 27, 2021.

Head coaching record

* 2020 NCAA Tournament cancelled

References

External links
South Dakota biography

1972 births
Living people
American men's basketball coaches
Basketball coaches from Minnesota
College men's basketball head coaches in the United States
Colorado State Rams men's basketball coaches
Mayville State Comets men's basketball coaches
Minot State Beavers men's basketball coaches
Nebraska Cornhuskers men's basketball coaches
North Dakota State Bison men's basketball coaches
Northern State University alumni
People from Marshall County, Minnesota
South Dakota Coyotes men's basketball coaches
University of North Dakota alumni
Utah State Aggies men's basketball coaches
Utah Utes men's basketball coaches